Taylor Johnson (born August 7, 2000) is an American tennis player.

Johnson started playing tennis at the age of five in her home town of Phoenix, Arizona. She moved to California at the age of 11 continuing to play tennis. 

On August 13, 2017, Johnson and her partner Claire Liu won the 2017 USTA Girls’ 18s National Championship. This win led to Johnson being ranked 8th in the world. With this victory, the pair earned a wild card into the main draw of the women's doubles tournament at the 2017 US Open. Johnson graduated from Connections Academy, and committed to play tennis at the division one level at UCLA. In her four years at UCLA, she was very successful. She was named to the athletic directors honor roll all four years, named ITA scholar athlete 2019-20 school year, and was on  the Pac-12 spring honor roll sophomore through senior year. Her junior year the Bruins won the Pac-12 regular season championship. Taylor graduated with an undergrad in communications in spring of 2022.

References

External links 
 
 

2000 births
Living people
American female tennis players
Sportspeople from Phoenix, Arizona
Tennis people from Arizona
21st-century American women
UCLA Bruins women's tennis players